Arthur Jack Meadows (24 January 1934 – 18 July 2016) was a British astronomer and information scientist. Known for founding the astronomy department of University of Leicester.

He had a wide-ranging career, including working at the British Museum and as a professor of library and information studies. He published extensively (30 books and over 250 journal articles).

Books (selected)
 Communication in Science
 Communicating Research

Honors
 A minor planet, Asteroid 4600 Meadows is named after him.
 Fulbright scholar, 1959-1961

References

Further reading
 Jack Meadows obituary by Alice Meadows, The Guardian Tuesday 2 August 2016 
 Obituary for Professor Jack Meadows, Loughborough, 2016-08-12

Academics of the University of Leicester
20th-century British astronomers
1934 births
2016 deaths